Two for the Road may refer to:
Two for the Road (film), a 1967 British comedy drama film
"Two for the Road" (Lost), a 2006 episode of the American drama television series Lost
Two for the Road (Herb Ellis and Joe Pass album), 1974
Two for the Road (Carmen McRae and George Shearing album), 1980
Two for the Road (Dave Grusin album), 1997
Two for the Road (Larry Coryell & Steve Khan album), 1977
"Two for the Road", a song by Bruce Springsteen from the box set Tracks